The 2022 Cincinnati Bearcats football team represented the University of Cincinnati during the 2022 NCAA Division I FBS football season. The Bearcats, members of the American Athletic Conference, played their home games at Nippert Stadium in Cincinnati, Ohio. 2022 was the program's sixth season under head coach Luke Fickell.

In September 2021, Cincinnati, Houston, and UCF accepted bids to join the Big 12. On June 10, the American Athletic Conference and the three schools set to depart from the league (Cincinnati, Houston, UCF) announced that they had reached a buyout agreement that will allow those schools to join the Big 12 Conference in 2023. The 2022 season will be the program's last season as a member of the AAC.

Previous season 
The Bearcats finished 2021 season 13–1, 8–0 in AAC play to receive a bid in the AAC Championship Game. They defeated Houston 35–20 in the championship game, marking the second consecutive AAC championship in program history. The Bearcats were ranked No. 4 in the final College Football Playoff rankings, thus becoming the first Group of Five team to make the College Football Playoff. The Bearcats were selected to participate in the Cotton Bowl as part of the College Football Playoff against Alabama. The Bearcats lost to Alabama 27–6. The Bearcats finished fourth in the final AP Poll marking the best finish in program history.

Junior Cornerback Sauce Gardner became the third Bearcat, and first position player, to be named a consensus All-American. by the NCAA, Gardner snagged first-team All-America honors from the AFCA, FWAA, Sporting News and the Associated Press to join kicker Jonathan Ruffin (2000) and punter Kevin Huber (2007, 2008) as Cincinnati's all-time consensus All-Americans.

Head Coach Luke Fickell was named AAC Coach of the Year, Sauce Gardner was named consensus AAC Defensive Player of the Year and Quarterback Desmond Ridder was named AAC Offensive Player of the Year for the second consecutive season.  Luke Fickell was named winner of the Paul "Bear" Bryant Award, AFCA Coach of the Year Award, Eddie Robinson Coach of the Year Award, Bobby Dodd Coach of the Year|, Home Depot National Coach of the Year, Walter Camp Foundation National Coach of the Year, and Sporting News National Coach of the Year. Cornerback Coby Bryant was named winner of the Jim Thorpe Award.

Offseason

NFL Draft

Nine Bearcats were selected in the 2022 NFL Draft, which was a school record, and was the third most of any school in the draft.

Coaching changes
On January 1, 2022, offensive coordinator Mike Denbrock who had been the Bearcats offensive coordinator the last five years left the school to take the same role at LSU. On January 5, 2022, Brian Mason who had been with Cincinnati for the previous 5 seasons, including the last four as special teams coordinator was hired by Notre Dame in the same role. On January 13, 2022, it was reported that cornerbacks coach Perry Eliano who spent the last two years at Cincinnati had accepted the safeties coaching job at Ohio State.

On January 17, 2022, The Athletic reported that UC was promoting quarterbacks coach Gino Guidugli to Offensive coordinator, and that Wide receivers coach Mike Brown was expected to add the role of passing game coordinator, previously held by Guidugli. Cincinnati also promoted Safeties coach Colin Hitschler to Co-defensive coordinator.  Also on January 17, 2022 it was announced that Cincinnati was hiring current Central Michigan offensive line coach Mike Cummings in the same role at Cincinnati.

On January 18, 2022, The Athletic reported that Kerry Coombs was being hired as the new cornerbacks coach and special teams coordinator. Coombs joins Cincinnati after serving most recently as  defensive coordinator at Ohio State the previous two seasons. He also was an assistant coach at Ohio State from 2012 to 2017 where he developed five first-round NFL draft picks.  Coombs previously coached at Cincinnati from 2007 to 2011, overseeing defensive backs and special teams. Additionally, he coached with the Tennessee Titans (2017–18) and was head coach at Colerain High School, from 1991 to 2006.

On January 19, 2022, Cincinnati hired former Bearcats defensive linemen Walter Stewart to coach outside linebackers, Stewart played at Cincinnati 2008–2012. Prior to returning to Cincinnati Stewart coached at defensive line at Arkansas State.  From 2019–2021 he was the defensive line coach at Temple, Defensive line at Northern Illinois in 2018. Prior to NIU Stewart was defensive line coach at Eastern Kentucky from 2016 and 2017.  In 2015, Stewart coached defensive ends at Florida A&M after being on the Tennessee staff from 2013–14.

On February 21, 2022, Cincinnati announced it has promoted offensive graduate assistant Nate Letton to tight ends coach.

On March 3, 2022, it was reported that Greg Scruggs accepted an assistant defensive line coach position with the New York Jets. After the departure of Scruggs, Walter Stewart was promoted to become the defensive line coach and James Ross III was hired as the outside linebackers coach.

Offseason departures

Transfers
Outgoing

Incoming

Recruiting

Preseason

Award watch lists
Listed in the order that they were released

American Athletic Conference preseason media poll
The American Athletic Conference preseason media poll was released at AAC Media Day on July 28, 2022. Cincinnati, the defending champions, were narrowly pipped by Houston to be preseason favorites, while obtaining 3 more votes for No.1.

Schedule
The Bearcats' 2022 schedule consists of six home games, five away games, and one neutral site game. Cincinnati will host two of its four non-conference games; against Kennesaw State (FCS) and Indiana. The Bearcats will travel to Arkansas to open the season in a one-game non-conference matchup, and also have play a neutral site matchup vs Miami (OH) at Paycor Stadium in the annual battle for the Victory Bell rivalry game.

Game summaries

at No. 19 Arkansas

No. 18 (FCS) Kennesaw State

vs. Miami (OH)

Indiana

at Tulsa

South Florida

at SMU

at UCF

Navy

East Carolina

at Temple

No. 19 Tulane

vs. Louisville – Fenway Bowl

Personnel

Roster and staff

Rankings

After the season

Awards and AAC honors

All-Americans

References

Cincinnati
Cincinnati Bearcats football seasons
Cincinnati Bearcats football